Norman Cornthwaite Nicholson  (8 January 1914 – 30 May 1987) was an English poet associated with the Cumbrian town of Millom. His poetry is noted for local concerns, straightforward language, and elements of common speech. Although known chiefly for poetry, Nicholson wrote much in other forms: novels, plays, essays, topography and criticism.

Life
Nicholson lived in 14 St George's Terrace, a Victorian terraced house and shop in the small industrial town of Millom on the edge of the Lake District, the son of Joseph Nicholson, a gentleman's outfitter, and his wife Edith Cornthwaite (died 1919).

Nicholson was educated at Holborn Hill School and Millom Secondary School, but his education was interrupted at the age of 16, when he needed treatment for pulmonary tuberculosis. He then spent two years at a sanatorium in Linford, Hampshire.

Nicholson was influenced by the social and religious community around the local Wesleyan Methodist chapel in Millom, to which belonged Rosetta Sobey, who became his stepmother in 1922. However he was confirmed in 1940 into the Church of England.

He was married in 1956 to Yvonne Edith Gardner (died 1982), a teacher who had consulted him about a school production of his play The Old Man of the Mountains. They began to travel extensively in Northern England, Scotland and Norway. They had no children.

Norman Nicholson died on 30 May 1987 in Whitehaven and was buried in St George's Churchyard, Millom.

Writings
Nicholson's writing career stretched from the 1930s until his death in 1987. He was published by T. S. Eliot at Faber and Faber. His works include Rock Face (1948) and the later Sea to the West (1981). He was elected to the Royal Society of Literature in 1945. He received altogether five honorary degrees from British universities, the Queen's Award for Poetry in 1977, and the OBE in 1981.

The work of Norman Nicholson is marked by a simplicity and directness of language drawn from the vernacular of the common people in his native town. Much of it concerns mining, quarrying and ironworks – the dominant industries in his area. Religion and faith were another aspect of his work. His poetry also abounds with direct quotations from everyday life, skilfully woven into the body of the poem. The opening of "Old Man at a Cricket Match" is typical:
<poem>
 'It's mending worse,' he said,
 Bending west his head...</poem>
One important trait in Nicholson's work is conscious adoption of provincialism coupled with a conscious rejection of the value judgements associated with it: "the smug, the narrow, the short-sighted... a bad copy of the life of the capital," as he called them. To him a provincial was one who lives in the place his parents, friends and relations live, where there is a shared culture, not "an enormous heterogeneous collection of people gathered from all corners of the country and deposited like silt at the delta of a great river." It is in a contained provincial community, "in our intense concern with what is close to us, that we most resemble the people of other countries and other times" and gain awareness of "that which is enduring in life and society."

Another important feature is Nicholson's Christianity. The religious poems in Five Rivers foreshadow verse plays of his – The Old Man of the Mountains (1946), A Match for the Devil (1955) and Birth by Drowning (1960) – placing the Bible in a distinctly Cumbrian setting. A fourth, Prophesy to the Wind (1947) is about survival after nuclear disaster.

As a poet Nicholson is not generally associated with any of the 20th-century movements. Like Charles Causley, he seems to be considered more of an isolated figure, working on his poetry outside the mainstream of poetic trends. Nonetheless, he acknowledged a debt to W. H. Auden and the way he had "turned to the industrial scene." His descriptive poetry can be remarkably vivid:
Above the collar of crags,
The granite pate breaks bare to the sky
Through a tonsure of bracken and bilberry.
(From "Eskdale Granite")
Nicholson's Lake District is not the Lake District of the Tourist Board, not Hawkshead and Windermere, but the industrial coastal towns of Millom, Egremont, Whitehaven, Bootle and Askam. His admirers included T. S. Eliot and Ted Hughes, and Seamus Heaney, who wrote in a poem of tribute:
...those Cumbrian phonetics
cracked like a plaited whip
until the slack, nostalgic
ambler in me trotted

on the paved margin
of my own black pool —
Dublin black pool, dubh linn
...that is yours and mine as well
Other aspects of Nicholson include his social awareness as a champion of the working class. He worked as a lecturer for the Workers' Educational Association. His poem "Windscale" about a 1957 nuclear accident has become something of an environmentalists' anthem.

The toadstool towers infest the shore:
Stink-horns that propagate and spore
Wherever the wind blows.
Scafell looks down from the bracken band
And sees hell in a grain of sand,
And feels the canker itch between his toes.

This is a land where the dirt is clean
And poison pasture, quick and green,
And storm sky, bright and bare;
Where sewers flow with milk, and meat
is carved up for the fire to eat,
And children suffocate in God's fresh air.

Nicholson was the subject of a South Bank Show broadcast in the United Kingdom on 4 November 1984.

Partial bibliography

Legacy
Millom Library and the John Rylands Library, Manchester, have bronze busts of Nicholson by Joan Palmer. A memorial stained-glass window created by Christine Boyce can be found in St George's Church, Millom.
Archive
Nicholson's papers are in the John Rylands Library, Manchester
Exhibition
Millom Discovery Centre houses information about Norman Nicholson.
Library
Nicholson's personal collection of published poetry was acquired by the John Rylands Library, Manchester, from his family.
Residence
Norman Nicholson's home at 14 St George's Terrace has become a food shop and café; there is a commemorative blue plaque on the front of the building.
Norman Nicholson Society
This was inaugurated in Millom on 31 March 2006, to celebrate and promote Nicholson's work as widely as possible. Melvyn Bragg is the Honorary President. It aims to be a focal point for appreciation and research and encourage republication of any Nicholson's works currently out of print. Talks and events are arranged throughout the year. The newsletter Comet, published and distributed free to members, contains articles on Nicholson's life and work, information about events and original material from members. Contributors have included David Cooper, Neil Curry, U. A. Fanthorpe, Harry Whalley and Matt Simpson. Contributions relevant to Nicholson's life and work are invited by the editor, Antoinette Fawcett.

References

Sources
Norman Nicholson: The Whispering Poet, a biography by Royal Literary Fund Fellow Kathleen Jones, The Book Mill, 2013, 
Norman Nicholson at 100 Essays and Memoirs on his Centenary, Edited by Stephen Matthews and Neil Curry, Bookcase, Carlisle, 2014 
Norman Nicholson, A Literary Life David Boyd, Seascale Press, 2015, 
Norman Nicholson, Philip Gardner, Twayne's English Authors Series, Twayne, New York, 1973,

Further reading
Kathleen Jones: Norman Nicholson: the whispering poet, Appleby: Book Mill, c. 2013,

External links
Nicholson in Millom
Five Norman Nicholson poems (one previously unpublished) read by Neil Curry
Location of Nicholson's house
Norman Nicholson Gallery at Millom Discovery Centre, Cumbria
Norman Nicholson Papers, John Rylands Library, University of Manchester

</blockquote>

1914 births
1987 deaths
20th-century English poets
English male poets
Anglican poets
Officers of the Order of the British Empire
People from Millom
20th-century English male writers